Yaroslav Igorevich Ivakin (born 22 July 1998) is a Russian football player who plays for FC Yenisey Krasnoyarsk.

Club career
He made his debut in the Russian Premier League for FC Arsenal Tula on 13 May 2018 in a game against FC Lokomotiv Moscow.

Career statistics

References

External links
 

1998 births
People from Murom
Sportspeople from Vladimir Oblast
Living people
Russian footballers
Association football midfielders
FC Arsenal Tula players
FC Khimik-Arsenal players
FC Yenisey Krasnoyarsk players
Russian Premier League players
Russian Second League players